The title Spam King may refer to:

 [Kieran Lang] (born 1975), American spammer,2002–present. 
 Oleg Nikolaenko (born 1987), Russian spammer waiting US federal trial
 Ryan Pitylak (born 1982), Also known as the "Texas Spam King"
 Alan Ralsky (1945-2021), American fraudster who gained notoriety after a 2002 Slashdot posting
 Scott Richter (born 1967)
 Robert Soloway (born 1980)
 Sanford Wallace (born 1968)

See also 

 List of spammers